Isaluy may refer to:
 Isaluy-e Heydarlu
 Isaluy-e Zemi